This is a list of the bird species recorded in the Netherlands Antilles. The avifauna of the Netherlands Antilles include a total of 286 species, of which five have been introduced by humans and 22 are rare or accidental. Four species are globally threatened.

This list's taxonomic treatment (designation and sequence of orders, families and species) and nomenclature (common and scientific names) follow the conventions of The Clements Checklist of Birds of the World, 6th edition. The family accounts at the beginning of each heading reflect this taxonomy, as do the species counts found in each family account. Introduced and accidental species are included in the total counts for the Netherlands Antilles.

The following tags have been used to highlight several categories. The commonly occurring native species do not fall into any of these categories.

(A) Accidental - a species that rarely or accidentally occurs in the Netherlands Antilles
(I) Introduced - a species introduced to the Netherlands Antilles as a consequence, direct or indirect, of human actions



Grebes
Order: PodicipediformesFamily: Podicipedidae

Grebes are small to medium-large freshwater diving birds. They have lobed toes and are excellent swimmers and divers. However, they have their feet placed far back on the body, making them quite ungainly on land.

Least grebe, Tachybaptus dominicus
Pied-billed grebe, Podilymbus podiceps

Shearwaters and petrels
Order: ProcellariiformesFamily: Procellariidae

The procellariids are the main group of medium-sized "true petrels", characterised by united nostrils with medium septum and a long outer functional primary.

Black-capped petrel, Pterodroma hasitata
Bulwer's petrel, Bulweria bulwerii
Great shearwater, Ardenna gravis
Audubon's shearwater, Puffinus lherminieri

Storm petrels
Order: ProcellariiformesFamily: Hydrobatidae

The storm petrels are relatives of the petrels and are the smallest seabirds. They feed on planktonic crustaceans and small fish picked from the surface, typically while hovering. The flight is fluttering and sometimes bat-like.

Wilson's storm petrel, Oceanites oceanicus
Leach's storm petrel, Oceanodroma leucorhoa

Tropicbirds
Order: PhaethontiformesFamily: Phaethontidae

Tropicbirds are slender white birds of tropical oceans, with exceptionally long central tail feathers. Their heads and long wings have black markings.

Red-billed tropicbird, Phaethon aethereus
White-tailed tropicbird, Phaethon lepturus

Boobies and gannets
Order: SuliformesFamily: Sulidae

The sulids comprise the gannets and boobies. Both groups are medium to large coastal seabirds that plunge-dive for fish.

Masked booby, Sula dactylatra
Red-footed booby, Sula sula
Brown booby, Sula leucogaster

Cormorants
Order: SuliformesFamily: Phalacrocoracidae

Phalacrocoracidae is a family of medium to large coastal, fish-eating seabirds that includes cormorants and shags. Plumage colouration varies, with the majority having mainly dark plumage, some species being black-and-white and a few being colourful.

Double-crested cormorant, Phalacrocorax auritus
Neotropic cormorant, Phalacrocorax brasilianus
Great cormorant, Phalacrocorax carbo

Frigatebirds
Order: SuliformesFamily: Fregatidae

Frigatebirds are large seabirds usually found over tropical oceans. They are large, black-and-white or completely black, with long wings and deeply forked tails. The males have coloured inflatable throat pouches. They do not swim or walk and cannot take off from a flat surface. Having the largest wingspan-to-body-weight ratio of any bird, they are essentially aerial, able to stay aloft for more than a week.

Magnificent frigatebird, Fregata magnificens

Pelicans
Order: PelecaniformesFamily: Pelecanidae

Pelicans are large water birds with a distinctive pouch under their beak. As with other members of the order Pelecaniformes, they have webbed feet with four toes.

Brown pelican, Pelecanus occidentalis

Bitterns, herons and egrets
Order: PelecaniformesFamily: Ardeidae

The family Ardeidae contains the bitterns, herons and egrets. Herons and egrets are medium to large wading birds with long necks and legs. Bitterns tend to be shorter necked and more wary. Members of Ardeidae fly with their necks retracted, unlike other long-necked birds such as storks, ibises and spoonbills.

Whistling heron, Syrigma sibilatrix (A)
Great blue heron, Ardea herodias
Great egret, Ardea alba
Reddish egret, Egretta rufescens
Tricoloured heron, Egretta tricolor
Little blue heron, Egretta caerulea
Snowy egret, Egretta thula
Little egret, Egretta garzetta (A)
Cattle egret, Bubulcus ibis
Striated heron, Butorides striata
Green heron, Butorides virescens
Black-crowned night-heron, Nycticorax nycticorax
Yellow-crowned night-heron, Nyctanassa violacea
Boat-billed heron, Cochlearius cochlearius
Pinnated bittern, Botaurus pinnatus

Ibises and spoonbills
Order: PelecaniformesFamily: Threskiornithidae

Threskiornithidae is a family of large terrestrial and wading birds which includes the ibises and spoonbills. They have long, broad wings with 11 primary and about 20 secondary feathers. They are strong fliers and despite their size and weight, very capable soarers.

American white ibis, Eudocimus albus
Scarlet ibis, Eudocimus ruber
Glossy ibis, Plegadis falcinellus
White-faced ibis, Plegadis chihi
Roseate spoonbill, Platalea ajaja

Storks
Order: CiconiiformesFamily: Ciconiidae

Storks are large, long-legged, long-necked, wading birds with long, stout bills. Storks are mute, but bill-clattering is an important mode of communication at the nest. Their nests can be large and may be reused for many years. Many species are migratory.

Wood stork, Mycteria americana

Flamingos
Order: PhoenicopteriformesFamily: Phoenicopteridae

Flamingos filter-feed on shellfish and algae. Their oddly shaped beaks are specially adapted to separate mud and silt from the food they consume and, uniquely, are used upside-down.

Caribbean flamingo, Phoenicopterus ruber

Ducks, geese and swans
Order: AnseriformesFamily: Anatidae

Anatidae includes the ducks and most duck-like waterfowl, such as geese and swans. These birds are adapted to an aquatic existence with webbed feet, flattened bills, and feathers that are excellent at shedding water due to an oily coating.

Fulvous whistling duck, Dendrocygna bicolor
White-faced whistling duck, Dendrocygna viduata
West Indian whistling duck, Dendrocygna arborea
Black-bellied whistling duck, Dendrocygna autumnalis
Greater white-fronted goose, Anser albifrons
Comb duck, Sarkidiornis melanotos
Wood duck, Aix sponsa (A)
American wigeon, Anas americana
Green-winged teal, Anas crecca
Mallard, Anas platyrhynchos (A)
Northern pintail, Anas acuta (A)
White-cheeked pintail, Anas bahamensis
Blue-winged teal, Anas discors
Northern shoveler, Anas clypeata
Ring-necked duck, Aythya collaris
Lesser scaup, Aythya affinis
Masked duck, Nomonyx dominica

New World vultures
Order: CathartiformesFamily: Cathartidae

The New World vultures are not closely related to Old World vultures, but superficially resemble them because of convergent evolution. Like the Old World vultures, they are scavengers. However, unlike Old World vultures, which find carcasses by sight, New World vultures have a good sense of smell with which they locate carrion.

Turkey vulture, Cathartes aura

Osprey
Order: AccipitriformesFamily: Pandionidae

The family Pandionidae contains only one species, the osprey. The osprey is a medium-large raptor which is a specialist fish-eater with a worldwide distribution.

Osprey, Pandion haliaetus

Hawks, kites and eagles
Order: AccipitriformesFamily: Accipitridae

Accipitridae is a family of birds of prey, which includes hawks, eagles, kites, harriers and Old World vultures. These birds have powerful hooked beaks for tearing flesh from their prey, strong legs, powerful talons and keen eyesight.

Swallow-tailed kite, Elanoides forficatus (A)
White-tailed kite, Elanus leucurus
Northern harrier, Circus cyaneus
White-tailed hawk, Buteo albicaudatus
Red-tailed hawk, Buteo jamaicensis

Caracaras and falcons
Order: FalconiformesFamily: Falconidae

Falconidae is a family of diurnal birds of prey. They differ from hawks, eagles and kites in that they kill with their beaks instead of their talons.

Crested caracara, Caracara cheriway
Yellow-headed caracara, Milvago chimachima
American kestrel, Falco sparverius
Merlin, Falco columbarius
Peregrine falcon, Falco peregrinus

New World quails
Order: GalliformesFamily: Odontophoridae

The New World quails are small, plump terrestrial birds only distantly related to the quails of the Old World, but named for their similar appearance and habits.

Crested bobwhite, Colinus cristatus

Limpkins
Order: GruiformesFamily: Aramidae

The limpkin resembles a large rail. It has drab-brown plumage and a greyer head and neck.

Limpkin, Aramus guarauna

Rails, crakes, gallinules and coots
Order: GruiformesFamily: Rallidae

Rallidae is a large family of small to medium-sized birds which includes the rails, crakes, coots and gallinules. Typically they inhabit dense vegetation in damp environments near lakes, swamps or rivers. In general they are shy and secretive birds, making them difficult to observe. Most species have strong legs and long toes which are well adapted to soft uneven surfaces. They tend to have short, rounded wings and to be weak fliers.

Sora, Porzana carolina
Purple gallinule, Porphyrio martinicus
Common gallinule, Gallinula galeata
American coot, Fulica americana

Jacanas
Order: CharadriiformesFamily: Jacanidae

The jacanas are a group of tropical waders in the family Jacanidae. They are found throughout the tropics. They are identifiable by their huge feet and claws which enable them to walk on floating vegetation in the shallow lakes that are their preferred habitat.

Wattled jacana, Jacana jacana

Oystercatchers
Order: CharadriiformesFamily: Haematopodidae

The oystercatchers are large and noisy plover-like birds, with strong bills used for smashing or prising open molluscs.

American oystercatcher, Haematopus palliatus

Avocets and stilts
Order: CharadriiformesFamily: Recurvirostridae

Recurvirostridae is a family of large wading birds, which includes the avocets and stilts. The avocets have long legs and long up-curved bills. The stilts have extremely long legs and long, thin, straight bills.

Black-necked stilt, Himantopus mexicanus
American avocet, Recurvirostra americana

Thick-knees
Order: CharadriiformesFamily: Burhinidae

The thick-knees are a group of largely tropical waders in the family Burhinidae. They are found worldwide within the tropical zone, with some species also breeding in temperate Europe and Australia. They are medium to large waders with strong black or yellow-black bills, large yellow eyes and cryptic plumage. Despite being classed as waders, most species have a preference for arid or semi-arid habitats.

Double-striped thick-knee, Burhinus bistriatus

Plovers and lapwings
Order: CharadriiformesFamily: Charadriidae

The family Charadriidae includes the plovers, dotterels and lapwings. They are small to medium-sized birds with compact bodies, short, thick necks and long, usually pointed, wings. They are found in open country worldwide, mostly in habitats near water.

Southern lapwing, Vanellus chilensis
American golden-plover, Pluvialis dominica
Black-bellied plover, Pluvialis squatarola
Semipalmated plover, Charadrius semipalmatus
Wilson's plover, Charadrius wilsonia
Killdeer, Charadrius vociferus
Piping plover, Charadrius melodus
Snowy plover, Charadrius nivosus
Collared plover, Charadrius collaris

Sandpipers and allies
Order: CharadriiformesFamily: Scolopacidae

Scolopacidae is a large diverse family of small to medium-sized shorebirds including the sandpipers, curlews, godwits, shanks, tattlers, woodcocks, snipes, dowitchers and phalaropes. The majority of these species eat small invertebrates picked out of the mud or soil. Variation in length of legs and bills enables multiple species to feed in the same habitat, particularly on the coast, without direct competition for food.

Wilson's snipe, Gallinago delicata
Short-billed dowitcher, Limnodromus griseus
Long-billed dowitcher, Limnodromus scolopaceus
Hudsonian godwit, Limosa haemastica
Whimbrel, Numenius phaeopus
Upland sandpiper, Bartramia longicauda
Greater yellowlegs, Tringa melanoleuca
Lesser yellowlegs, Tringa flavipes
Solitary sandpiper, Tringa solitaria
Willet, Tringa semipalmata
Spotted sandpiper, Actitis macularia
Ruddy turnstone, Arenaria interpres
Red knot, Calidris canutus
Sanderling, Calidris alba
Semipalmated sandpiper, Calidris pusilla
Western sandpiper, Calidris mauri
Least sandpiper, Calidris minutilla
White-rumped sandpiper, Calidris fuscicollis
Baird's sandpiper, Calidris bairdii
Pectoral sandpiper, Calidris melanotos
Dunlin, Calidris alpina (A)
Stilt sandpiper, Calidris himantopus
Buff-breasted sandpiper, Calidris subruficollis
Wilson's phalarope, Phalaropus tricolor
Red-necked phalarope, Phalaropus lobatus
Red phalarope, Phalaropus fulicarius (A)

Skuas and jaegers
Order: CharadriiformesFamily: Stercorariidae

The family Stercorariidae are, in general, medium to large birds, typically with grey or brown plumage, often with white markings on the wings. They nest on the ground in temperate and arctic regions and are long-distance migrants.

Great skua, Stercorarius skua
Pomarine jaeger, Stercorarius pomarinus
Parasitic jaeger, Stercorarius parasiticus

Gulls, terns and skimmers
Order: CharadriiformesFamily: Laridae

Laridae is a family of medium to large seabirds and includes gulls, kittiwakes, terns and skimmers. They are typically grey or white, often with black markings on the head or wings. They have longish bills and webbed feet. Terns are a group of generally medium to large seabirds typically with grey or white plumage, often with black markings on the head. Most terns hunt fish by diving but some pick insects off the surface of fresh water. Terns are generally long-lived birds, with several species known to live in excess of 30 years. Skimmers are a small family of tropical tern-like birds. They have an elongated lower mandible which they use to feed by flying low over the water surface and skimming the water for small fish.

Ring-billed gull, Larus delawarensis
Great black-backed gull, Larus marinus
Lesser black-backed gull, Larus fuscus
Herring gull, Larus argentatus
Black-headed gull, Chroicocephalus ridibundus
Bonaparte's gull, Chroicocephalus philadelphia
Laughing gull, Leucophaeus atricilla
Franklin's gull, Leucophaeus pipixcan
Gull-billed tern, Gelochelidon nilotica
Caspian tern, Hydroprogne caspia
Sandwich tern, Thalasseus sandvicensis
Royal tern, Thalasseus maxima
Roseate tern, Sterna dougallii
Common tern, Sterna hirundo
Least tern, Sternula antillarum
Bridled tern, Onychoprion anaethetus
Sooty tern, Onychoprion fuscata
Black tern, Chlidonias niger
Large-billed tern, Phaetusa simplex
Black noddy, Anous minutus
Brown noddy, Anous stolidus
Black skimmer, Rynchops niger

Pigeons and doves
Order: ColumbiformesFamily: Columbidae

Pigeons and doves are stout-bodied birds with short necks and short slender bills with a fleshy cere.

Rock dove, Columba livia (I)
White-crowned pigeon, Patagioenas leucocephala (A)
Scaly-naped pigeon, Patagioenas squamosa
Bare-eyed pigeon, Patagioenas corensis
Eared dove, Zenaida auriculata
Zenaida dove, Zenaida aurita
White-winged dove, Zenaida asiatica (A)
Common ground-dove, Columbina passerina
Ruddy ground dove, Columbina talpacoti
White-tipped dove, Leptotila verreauxi
Bridled quail-dove, Geotrygon mystacea

Parrots, macaws and allies
Order: PsittaciformesFamily: Psittacidae

Parrots are small to large birds with a characteristic curved beak. Their upper mandibles have slight mobility in the joint with the skull and they have a generally erect stance. All parrots are zygodactyl, having the four toes on each foot placed two at the front and two to the back.

Brown-throated parakeet, Eupsittula pertinax
Green-rumped parrotlet, Forpus passerinus
White-crowned parrot, Pionus senilis (A)
Yellow-shouldered amazon, Amazona barbadensis
Orange-winged amazon, Amazona amazonica (I)

Cuckoos and anis
Order: CuculiformesFamily: Cuculidae

The family Cuculidae includes cuckoos, roadrunners and anis. These birds are of variable size with slender bodies, long tails and strong legs. The Old World cuckoos are brood parasites.

Yellow-billed cuckoo, Coccyzus americanus
Mangrove cuckoo, Coccyzus minor
Grey-capped cuckoo, Coccyzus lansbergi
Smooth-billed ani, Crotophaga ani (A)
Groove-billed ani, Crotophaga sulcirostris
Guira cuckoo, Guira guira

Barn owls
Order: StrigiformesFamily: Tytonidae

Barn owls are medium to large owls with large heads and characteristic heart-shaped faces. They have long strong legs with powerful talons.

Barn owl, Tyto alba

Typical owls
Order: StrigiformesFamily: Strigidae

The typical owls are small to large solitary nocturnal birds of prey. They have large forward-facing eyes and ears, a hawk-like beak and a conspicuous circle of feathers around each eye called a facial disk.

Burrowing owl, Athene cunicularia

Oilbird
Order: CaprimulgiformesFamily: Steatornithidae

The oilbird is a slim, long-winged bird related to the nightjars. It is nocturnal and a specialist feeder on the fruit of the oil palm.

Oilbird, Steatornis caripensis

Nightjars
Order: CaprimulgiformesFamily: Caprimulgidae

Nightjars are medium-sized nocturnal birds that usually nest on the ground. They have long wings, short legs and very short bills. Most have small feet, of little use for walking, and long pointed wings. Their soft plumage is camouflaged to resemble bark or leaves.

Lesser nighthawk, Chordeiles acutipennis
Common nighthawk, Chordeiles minor
Antillean nighthawk, Chordeiles gundlachii
Chuck-will's-widow, Antrostomus carolinensis
White-tailed nightjar, Hydropsalis cayennensis

Swifts
Order: ApodiformesFamily: Apodidae

Swifts are small birds which spend the majority of their lives flying. These birds have very short legs and never settle voluntarily on the ground, perching instead only on vertical surfaces. Many swifts have long swept-back wings which resemble a crescent or boomerang.

White-collared swift, Streptoprocne zonaris
Chimney swift, Chaetura pelagica

Hummingbirds
Order: TrochiliformesFamily: Trochilidae

Hummingbirds are small birds capable of hovering in mid-air due to the rapid flapping of their wings. They are the only birds that can fly backwards.

Rufous-breasted hermit, Glaucis hirsuta
White-necked jacobin, Florisuga mellivora
Purple-throated carib, Eulampis jugularis
Green-throated carib, Eulampis holosericeus
Ruby-topaz hummingbird, Chrysolampis mosquitus
Antillean crested hummingbird, Orthorhyncus cristatus
Blue-tailed emerald, Chlorostilbon mellisugus
Copper-rumped hummingbird, Saucerottia tobaci

Kingfishers
Order: CoraciiformesFamily: Alcedinidae

Kingfishers are medium-sized birds with large heads, long, pointed bills, short legs and stubby tails.

Belted kingfisher, Megaceryle alcyon
Amazon kingfisher, Chloroceryle amazona

Woodpeckers and allies
Order: PiciformesFamily: Picidae

Woodpeckers are small to medium-sized birds with chisel-like beaks, short legs, stiff tails and long tongues used for capturing insects. Some species have feet with two toes pointing forward and two backward, while several species have only three toes. Many woodpeckers have the habit of tapping noisily on tree trunks with their beaks.

Yellow-bellied sapsucker, Sphyrapicus varius

Ovenbirds
Order: PasseriformesFamily: Furnariidae

Ovenbirds comprise a large family of small sub-oscine passerine bird species found in Central and South America. They are a diverse group of insectivores which gets its name from the elaborate "oven-like" clay nests built by some species, although others build stick nests or nest in tunnels or clefts in rock.

Scaly-throated leaftosser, Sclerurus guatemalensis (A)

Woodcreepers
Order: PasseriformesFamily: Dendrocolaptidae

The Dendrocolaptidae are brownish birds which maintain an upright vertical posture, supported by their stiff tail vanes. They feed mainly on insects taken from tree trunks.

Olivaceous woodcreeper, Sittasomus griseicapillus (A)

Tyrant flycatchers
Order: PasseriformesFamily: Tyrannidae

Tyrant flycatchers are passerine birds which occur throughout North and South America. They superficially resemble the Old World flycatchers, but are more robust and have stronger bills. They do not have the sophisticated vocal capabilities of the songbirds. Most, but not all, have plain colouring. As the name implies, most are insectivorous.

Caribbean elaenia, Elaenia martinica
Small-billed elaenia, Elaenia parvirostris
Lesser elaenia, Elaenia chiriquensis
Northern scrub-flycatcher, Sublegatus arenarum
Olive-sided flycatcher, Contopus cooperi
Eastern wood-pewee, Contopus virens
Vermilion flycatcher, Pyrocephalus rubinus
Brown-crested flycatcher, Myiarchus tyrannulus
Tropical kingbird, Tyrannus melancholicus
Eastern kingbird, Tyrannus tyrannus
Grey kingbird, Tyrannus dominicensis
Fork-tailed flycatcher, Tyrannus savana

Swallows and martins
Order: PasseriformesFamily: Hirundinidae

The family Hirundinidae is adapted to aerial feeding. They have a slender streamlined body, long pointed wings and a short bill with a wide gape. The feet are adapted to perching rather than walking, and the front toes are partially joined at the base.

Purple martin, Progne subis
Cuban martin, Progne cryptoleuca
Caribbean martin, Progne dominicensis
White-winged swallow, Tachycineta albiventer
Chilean swallow, Tachycineta meyeni
Northern rough-winged swallow, Stelgidopteryx serripennis
Bank swallow, Riparia riparia
Cliff swallow, Petrochelidon pyrrhonota
Cave swallow, Petrochelidon fulva
Barn swallow, Hirundo rustica

Waxwings
Order: PasseriformesFamily: Bombycillidae

The waxwings are a group of birds with soft silky plumage and unique red tips to some of the wing feathers. In the Bohemian and cedar waxwings, these tips look like sealing wax and give the group its name. These are arboreal birds of northern forests. They live on insects in summer and berries in winter.

Cedar waxwing, Bombycilla cedrorum

Wrens
Order: PasseriformesFamily: Troglodytidae

The wrens are mainly small and inconspicuous except for their loud songs. These birds have short wings and thin down-turned bills. Several species often hold their tails upright. All are insectivorous.

House wren, Troglodytes aedon

Mockingbirds and thrashers
Order: PasseriformesFamily: Mimidae

The mimids are a family of passerine birds that includes thrashers, mockingbirds, tremblers and the New World catbirds. These birds are notable for their vocalizations, especially their ability to mimic a wide variety of birds and other sounds heard outdoors. Their colouring tends towards dull-greys and browns.

Tropical mockingbird, Mimus gilvus
Brown thrasher, Toxostoma rufum (A)
Brown trembler, Cinclocerthia ruficauda
Scaly-breasted thrasher, Allenia fusca
Pearly-eyed thrasher, Margarops fuscatus

Thrushes and allies
Order: PasseriformesFamily: Turdidae

The thrushes are a group of passerine birds that occur mainly in the Old World. They are plump, soft plumaged, small to medium-sized insectivores or sometimes omnivores, often feeding on the ground. Many have attractive songs.

Veery, Catharus fuscescens
Grey-cheeked thrush, Catharus minimus
Swainson's thrush, Catharus ustulatus
Wood thrush, Hylocichla mustelina

Old World flycatchers
Order: PasseriformesFamily: Muscicapidae

Old World flycatchers are a large group of small passerine birds native to the Old World. They are mainly small arboreal insectivores. The appearance of these birds is highly varied, but they mostly have weak songs and harsh calls.

Northern wheatear, Oenanthe oenanthe

Starlings
Order: PasseriformesFamily: Sturnidae

Starlings are small to medium-sized passerine birds. Their flight is strong and direct and they are very gregarious. Their preferred habitat is fairly open country. They eat insects and fruit. Plumage is typically dark with a metallic sheen.

European starling, Sturnus vulgaris (I)

Weavers and allies
Order: PasseriformesFamily: Ploceidae

The weavers are small passerine birds related to the finches. They are seed-eating birds with rounded conical bills. The males of many species are brightly coloured, usually in red or yellow and black, some species show variation in colour only in the breeding season.

Village weaver, Ploceus cucullatus (I)

Vireos
Order: PasseriformesFamily: Vireonidae

The vireos are a group of small to medium-sized passerine birds restricted to the New World. They are typically greenish in colour and resemble wood warblers apart from their heavier bills.

Yellow-throated vireo, Vireo flavifrons
Philadelphia vireo, Vireo philadelphicus (A)
Red-eyed vireo, Vireo olivaceus
Black-whiskered vireo, Vireo altiloquus

New World warblers
Order: PasseriformesFamily: Parulidae

The New World warblers are a group of small, often colourful, passerine birds restricted to the New World. Most are arboreal, but some are terrestrial. Most members of this family are insectivores.

Golden-winged warbler, Vermivora chrysoptera (A)
Tennessee warbler, Oreothlypis peregrina
Northern parula, Setophaga americana
Yellow warbler, Setophaga petechia
Chestnut-sided warbler, Setophaga pensylvanica
Magnolia warbler, Setophaga magnolia (A)
Cape May warbler, Setophaga tigrina
Black-throated blue warbler, Setophaga caerulescens
Yellow-rumped warbler, Setophaga coronata
Black-throated green warbler, Setophaga virens
Blackburnian warbler, Setophaga fusca
Prairie warbler, Setophaga discolor
Palm warbler, Setophaga palmarum
Bay-breasted warbler, Setophaga castanea
Blackpoll warbler, Setophaga striata
Cerulean warbler, Setophaga cerulea
Hooded warbler, Setophaga citrina
American redstart, Setophaga ruticilla
Black-and-white warbler, Mniotilta varia
Prothonotary warbler, Protonotaria citrea
Worm-eating warbler, Helmitheros vermivorus
Ovenbird, Seiurus aurocapilla
Northern waterthrush, Parkesia noveboracensis
Louisiana waterthrush, Parkesia motacilla
Connecticut warbler, Oporornis agilis
Kentucky warbler, Geothlypis formosa
Mourning warbler, Geothlypis philadelphia
Common yellowthroat, Geothlypis trichas
Canada warbler, Cardellina canadensis

Tanagers
Order: PasseriformesFamily: Thraupidae

The tanagers are a large group of small to medium-sized passerine birds restricted to the New World, mainly in the tropics. Many species are brightly coloured. They are seed eaters, but their preference tends towards fruit and nectar.

Golden-hooded tanager, Tangara larvata
Masked tanager, Tangara nigrocincta
Red-legged honeycreeper, Cyanerpes cyaneus
Bananaquit, Coereba flaveola

Buntings, sparrows, seedeaters and allies
Order: PasseriformesFamily: Emberizidae

The emberizids are a large family of passerine birds. They are seed-eating birds with distinctively shaped bills. In Europe, most species are called buntings. In North America, most of the species in this family are known as sparrows, but these birds are not closely related to the Old World sparrows which are in the family Passeridae. Many emberizid species have distinctive head patterns.

Blue-black grassquit, Volatinia jacarina
Black-faced grassquit, Tiaris bicolor
Lesser Antillean bullfinch, Loxigilla noctis
Saffron finch, Sicalis flaveola
Grasshopper sparrow, Ammodramus savannarum
White-throated sparrow, Zonotrichia albicollis
Rufous-collared sparrow, Zonotrichia capensis

Cardinals and allies
Order: PasseriformesFamily: Cardinalidae

The cardinals are a family of robust, seed-eating birds with strong bills. They are typically associated with open woodland. The sexes usually have distinct plumages.

Scarlet tanager, Piranga olivacea
Summer tanager, Piranga rubra
Western tanager, Piranga ludoviciana (A)
Rose-breasted grosbeak, Pheucticus ludovicianus
Black-headed grosbeak, Pheucticus melanocephalus
Blue-black grosbeak, Cyanocompsa cyanoides (A)
Blue grosbeak, Passerina caerulea (A)
Indigo bunting, Passerina cyanea
Dickcissel, Spiza americana

Siskins, crossbills and allies
Order: PasseriformesFamily: Fringillidae

Finches are seed-eating passerine birds, that are small to moderately large and have a strong beak, usually conical and in some species very large. All have twelve tail feathers and nine primaries. These birds have a bouncing flight with alternating bouts of flapping and gliding on closed wings, and most sing well.

Antillean euphonia, Euphonia musica

Troupials and allies
Order: PasseriformesFamily: Icteridae

The icterids are a group of small to medium-sized, often colourful, passerine birds restricted to the New World and include the grackles, New World blackbirds and New World orioles. Most species have black as the predominant plumage colour, often enlivened by yellow, orange or red.

Bobolink, Dolichonyx oryzivorus
Yellow-hooded blackbird, Chrysomus icterocephalus
Red-breasted meadowlark, Sturnella militaris (A)
Eastern meadowlark, Sturnella magna
Carib grackle, Quiscalus lugubris
Shiny cowbird, Molothrus bonariensis
South American yellow oriole, Icterus nigrogularis
Venezuelan troupial, Icterus icterus
Baltimore oriole, Icterus galbula

Sparrows
Order: PasseriformesFamily: Passeridae

Sparrows are small passerine birds. In general, sparrows tend to be small, plump, brown or grey birds with short tails and short powerful beaks. Sparrows are seed eaters, but they also consume small insects.

House sparrow, Passer domesticus (I)

See also
List of birds
Lists of birds by region

References

Netherlands Antilles
 Lists
Birds
Netherlands Antilles